Tachina anguisipennis is a species of fly in the family Tachinidae. It is endemic to China.

References

Insects described in 1987
Diptera of Asia
Endemic fauna of China
anguisipennis